Stanley Lawrence Swanson (May 19, 1944 – September 1, 2017) was a baseball player who played for the Montreal Expos in . He was born on May 19, 1944 in Yuba City, California. He was originally signed as a free agent by the Cincinnati Reds in 1963.

References

Baseball Reference

1944 births
2017 deaths
Baseball players from California
People from Yuba City, California
American expatriate baseball players in Canada
Major League Baseball outfielders
Montreal Expos players
Portland Beavers players
Knoxville Smokies players
Peninsula Grays players
Buffalo Bisons (minor league) players
Winnipeg Whips players
Indianapolis Indians players